The Herd is a 1978 Turkish drama film, written, produced and co-directed by Yılmaz Güney with Zeki Ökten during Güney's second imprisonment, featuring Tarık Akan as a peasant, forced by a local blood feud to sell his sheep in faraway Ankara. According to his own account, the development of the script of Sürü, began in 1973 in prison in Selimya and finished it while in prison in Izmit. The conditions to write were at times rather difficult, in Izmit he wrote in a room he shared together with eighty other inmates.

Awards
17th Antalya Golden Orange Film Festival
Belated Golden Orange for Best Film (won)
Belated Golden Orange for Best Director: Zeki Ökten (won, also for The Enemy)
Belated Golden Orange for Best Music: Zülfü Livaneli (won)
Belated Golden Orange for Best Actress: Melike Demirağ (won, shared with Güngör Bayrak for The Enemy)
Belated Golden Orange for Best Actor: Tarık Akan (won, also for The Sacrifice, shared with Aytaç Arman for The Enemy)
Belated Golden Orange for Best Supporting Actor: Tuncel Kurtiz (won)
Belgian Film Critics Association: Grand Prix (won)

References

External links

TurkishFilmChannel Distributor page for the film 

1970s political drama films
Turkish political drama films
Films set in Turkey
Films set in Ankara
Films shot in Ankara
Films about sheep
Golden Orange Award for Best Film winners
Golden Leopard winners
Films directed by Zeki Ökten
Films directed by Yılmaz Güney
1970s Turkish-language films
1978 films